Tuchodi Peak is a  peak in British Columbia, Canada, rising to a prominence of  above South Gataga Pass. 
It is part of the Northern Rocky Mountains, and is named after the Tuchodi River.

References
Citations

Sources

Two-thousanders of British Columbia
Canadian Rockies